A list of films produced by the Marathi language film industry based in Maharashtra in the year 1995.

1995 Releases
A list of Marathi films released in 1995.

References

Lists of 1995 films by country or language
 Marathi
1995